M.S.Manickam (born 26 October 1946) was an Indian politician, businessman, farmer, and former member of the Legislative Assembly of Tamil Nadu better known locally as MSM.

Family life

He was born in a village named Thagattur in Vedaranyam Taluk, Nagapattinam District. He is the elder son of the family. His immediate family is short, his wife named Latha, Daughter Radha and Son Srinivasan. His family was lived at his native village Thagattur until 1991. In 1991, he temporarily relocated his family to nearby town Thiruthuraipoondi, Thiruvarur District for his children's school education and then to Tiruchirappalli for their higher education in 2001. He is a deep follower of Hinduism.

Education

M. S. Manickam completed his graduation and post-graduation in Arts from Alagappa Government Arts College, Karaikudi in Alagappa University and Pachaiyappa's College, Chennai Madras University.He studied along with Andhra ex.CM -Mr.Chandrababu naidu in higher studies

Role

Agriculture
M. S. Manickam was an agriculturist naturally.

Business
M. S. Manickam involved partially in business activities [to be filled].

Politics

ADMK (1972–1995)
M. S. Manickam entered politics during his college life, inspired by M. G. Ramachandran acting in Tamil films and election campaign for DMK, and involved in MGR's charity activities organized by their fans in college. He joined M.G.Ramachandran's new party Anna Dravida Munnetra Kazhagam (ADMK) in 1972 along with his college seniors and mentors who are very active in MGR charities.

Member of the Legislative Assembly
M. S. Manickam contested as Anna Dravida Munnetra Kazhagam candidate for the first time (after MGR's split from DMK in 1972) to the Tamil Nadu legislative assembly in 1977 at the age of 30, but lost to M. Meenakshi Sundaram (DMK candidate) and came to the third position while congress candidate took the second spot.

He was elected to the Tamil Nadu legislative assembly as an Anna Dravida Munnetra Kazhagam candidate from Vedaranyam constituency in the 1980 election at the age of 33. He worked hard for the people during his tenure between 1980 and 1984.

Exit from ADMK
After MGR's death in 1987 and the new ADMK party head's takeover changed the scenario of M. S. Manickam's political activities. In 1995, he left the All India Anna Dravida Munnetra Kazhagam (AIADMK) as there was no room for him to serve the people in that party.

Mentor (1995–2009)
After leaving ADMK in 1995 he was little active in politics with MGR Kazhagam formed by R. M. Veerappan and then later he gradually given his way to newcomers who are looking energetic in politics to do good for the society by supporting them in Assembly Elections Win and as their mentor.

DMK (2010-until Death)
In early 2010 he was defected to the Thai Kazhagam (Mother Party) Dravida Munnetra Kazhagam along with few Ex. MLAs and Ex. Minister Alagu.Thirunavukkarasu, thought to come back in active politics to do something left in him for the people.

Death
Suffering from sudden heart pain in the early morning, he was admitted to the Apollo Hospital in Chennai on 14 December 2010 afternoon. He died due to Heart Attack at the age of 64 on the same day 9:31 p.m at Appollo Hospital. On his funeral, the next day thousands of public, relatives, family members and local politicians from all the parties were attended. His son, Srinivasan performed his last rites at the Crematorium, Thagattur, Vedaranyam Taluk.

References

1946 births
2010 deaths
Dravida Munnetra Kazhagam politicians
All India Anna Dravida Munnetra Kazhagam politicians
Tamil Nadu MLAs 1980–1984
People from Nagapattinam district